Zepter may refer to:

 Philip Zepter, a Serbian entrepreneur
 Zepter International, multinational company owned by Philip Zepter
 German word for sceptre